Hofer Ranch is a historic ranch with ranch house, located at 11248 South Turner Avenue in Ontario, located in the Pomona Valley and San Bernardino County, in southern California.

History
Sanford Ballou purchased the ranch sight unseen in 1882, but he did not develop the property until he and his son Benton built a barn in 1898. Benton lived at and maintained the ranch, which mainly grew grapes, apricots, and peaches.

He built the ranch's main house in 1905 by significantly adding to an old school building on the property. The house has a vernacular California ranch house design, with a low roof and horizontal emphasis.

The ranch primarily became a vineyard in the 1930s as nematode infestations and New Deal regulations hurt the profitability of other fruits.

The ranch was added as a Historic district to the National Register of Historic Places on July 8, 1993.

Present day
, the Hofer Ranch is still in operation, though at  it is much reduced in size. Said to be the best-preserved ranch in Ontario, it is one of the area's few surviving remnants of a notable agricultural history.

Politics
Hofer Ranch is also a major supporter of polarizing Congresswoman Marjorie Taylor Greene (R) Georgia. Per Opensecrets.org

See also
National Register of Historic Places listings in San Bernardino County, California

References

Ranches in California
Houses in San Bernardino County, California
Ontario, California
Pomona Valley
Houses completed in 1905
Historic districts on the National Register of Historic Places in California
Houses on the National Register of Historic Places in California
National Register of Historic Places in San Bernardino County, California
Ranches on the National Register of Historic Places in California
Vernacular architecture in California
1905 establishments in California